The International Mercantile Marine Company, originally the International Navigation Company, was a trust formed in the early twentieth century as an attempt by J.P. Morgan to monopolize the shipping trade.

IMM was founded by shipping magnates Clement Griscom of the American Line and Red Star Line, Bernard N. Baker of the Atlantic Transport Line, J. Bruce Ismay of the White Star Line, and John Ellerman of the Leyland Line. The Dominion Line was also amalgamated. The project was bankrolled by J.P. Morgan & Co., led by financier J. P. Morgan. The company also had working profit-sharing relationships with the German Hamburg-Amerika and the North German Lloyd lines. The trust caused great concern in the British shipping industry and led directly to the British government's subsidy of the Cunard Line's new ships RMS Lusitania and RMS Mauretania in an effort to compete.

IMM was a holding company that controlled subsidiary corporations that had their own subsidiaries. Morgan hoped to dominate transatlantic shipping through interlocking directorates and contractual arrangements with the railroads, but that proved impossible because of the nature of sea transport, American antitrust legislation, and an agreement with the British government. One of IMM's subsidiaries was the White Star Line, which owned the RMS Titanic.  Analysis of financial records shows that IMM was overleveraged and suffered from inadequate cash flow that caused it to default on bond interest payments in late 1914. As a result, a "friendly" receivership was put in effect in 1915, which allowed IMM to reorganize its finances; it emerged from the receivership in 1916.  Saved by World War I, IMM eventually re-emerged, after a merger with Roosevelt Steamship Company, as the United States Lines, which itself went bankrupt in 1986.

A proposed subsidy bill in the United States Congress failed, which became widely apparent by April 1902  and the company thus was never truly successful.  Beginning in the 1920s, the company underwent a series of corporate acquisitions and mergers, which resulted in its becoming the United States Lines in 1943.

History

Founding of the company
As the shipping industry prospered in the late 19th century, some sought to create a trust that would monopolize U.S. shipping companies. However, all negotiations in this regard in the 1890s fell short. The intervention of John Pierpont Morgan, one of the richest men in the world, would change that.

The Atlantic Transport Line, owned by Bernard N. Baker and having both passenger and cargo ships, competed intensely with British and other shipping companies. Baker tried to sell his company to John Ellerman, chairman of the cargo-carrying Leyland Line, who had tried unsuccessfully to take possession of the Cunard Line and HAPAG, two powerful European companies. Negotiations between Baker and Ellerman, advanced but ultimately fell through.

Meanwhile, J. P. Morgan had already concluded agreements with Clement Griscom, president of the International Navigation Company, which operated the Red Star Line and the American Line. Finally, in December 1900, after six months of negotiations, the Atlantic Transport Line joined INC.

Subsequently, Baker, J. P. Morgan, and Simon Bettle Jr. (representative of the INC) negotiated with Ellerman, this time with a view to redeem his property. There would be two companies that would join the trust. The name of one of them was revealed in April 1901: the Leyland Line. The second turned out to be the prestigious White Star Line, bought by Morgan's team, after long negotiations, in April 1902. On 1 October 1902, JP Morgan & Co. announced the founding of the International Mercantile Marine Company, more commonly called IMM. (Constituent elements of IMM, including INC (chartered in 1871), had however been operating for many years already.) IMM was incorporated in New Jersey.

Golden age

Morgan's role evolved over the years. Being American, he could not directly own British ships, but he could own the company that owned the ships. In 1902, the IMM carried 64,738 passengers, a total buoyed by high immigration to the United States. The IMM had signed a partnership with the two most important German shipping companies, Norddeutscher Lloyd and HAPAG, which carried a total of 66,838 passengers. The German-Morgan agreement, signed in New York on 20 February 1902, was a key step in the formation of what was to become the IMM, but did not fully address long-standing competitive friction between and amongst the major German and British transatlantic shipping companies.

Responses in the United Kingdom helped intensify these rivalries. Cunard Line, one of the British shipping companies with independent significance, received grants from the British government for the construction of two great ocean liners, the Lusitania and the Mauretania, which were placed into service in late 1907.

Since 1902, IMM had an agreement with James Pirrie, chairman of Harland & Wolff and member of the management of the White Star Line, stating that the vessels of the company will be built by Harland & Wolff for all the time. Ships of the company were also shifting from one company to another, like the Belgic, built for the White Star Line, which was transferred to the service of the Red Star Line under the name , or the Regina became the Westernland. This allowed the IMM to schedule a ship each day from the United Kingdom, and passengers to change their tickets to a position equivalent to another vessel of the company. Baker retired from the direction of the Atlantic Transport Line shortly after its integration with the IMM, and was replaced by Philip Franklin. He later became vice president of IMM, while Griscom was replaced as president by Joseph Bruce Ismay in 1904 (who was also president of the White Star Line).

Decline

The early 1910s marked a turning point for the IMM. Indeed, on 15 April 1912, the Titanic, flagship of its fleet, sank during her maiden voyage. Besides the financial and human losses, the sinking had repercussions on the organization of the trust. Through the American commission of inquiry devoted to the sinking, Senator William Alden Smith openly attacked the very principle of the company and Morgan. As had been arranged before Titanic sank, J. Bruce Ismay retired as president of IMM in 1913 and was succeeded by Harold Sanderson Morgan died on 31 March 1913.   After the 1915-16 receivership, Sanderson was succeeded as president by Franklin, who had been the receiver.

However, the sinking of the Titanic did not bring about the end of the IMM. Although theoretically powerful due to its continued influence with some of the top American, British, and German shipping companies, the overseeing company never managed to overcome its own financial problems, nor dominate the bulk of the North Atlantic shipping trade, and was therefore not as successful as expected. The company went into receivership in 1915 and was placed in the hands of Franklin, who managed to save it. In the late 1920s, he received grants from the government to American ships (built in the United States or flying the flag) and in 1926 it sold the White Star Line to the Royal Mail Steam Packet Company for £7 million, of which £2.35 million was still unpaid when the Royal Mail Group, which was overleveraged and undercapitalized, collapsed in the early 1930s. In 1930, IMM possessed 30 vessels. There were 19 in 1933 and only 11 by 1935.

The ailing company merged with the Roosevelt Steamship Company, parent company of the Roosevelt Line, in 1931 to form Roosevelt International Mercantile Marine Company (RIMM). Later in 1931, RIMM acquired the financially troubled United States Lines and began consolidating its operations under that brand. The Atlantic Transport Line was dissolved in late 1931 and its ships were distributed throughout RIMM's remaining divisions.

The American Line was merged into United States Lines in 1932, the Red Star Line was sold to Arnold Bernstein in 1934, Baltimore Mail Line merged into United States Lines in 1937, the Panama Pacific Line was dissolved in 1938 and its ships divested, and American Merchant Line was merged into United States Lines in 1938.

Finally, the Roosevelt Line was merged into United States Lines in 1940, leaving that company as RIMM's only remaining business. RIMM changed its name to United States Lines Inc. in 1943, recasting itself as a smaller company focused exclusively on transatlantic routes under a single brand.

Some businesses of the modern shipping industry still regard IMM as an early attempt at the corporate ownership of several companies under a single trust; the kind of large overseeing companies that dominate much of the maritime shipping world today.

Presidents
Clement A. Griscom, 1902–1904
J. Bruce Ismay, 1904–1913
Harold A. Sanderson, 1913–1915
Receivership, 1915–1916
Philip Albright Small Franklin, 1916-1936 
John A. Franklin, 1936–1943

Company became United States Lines Inc, 1943

Companies owned by IMM

 American Line: 1873-1932
 Inman Line: 1886-1893
 American Merchant Line: 1924-1938
 Holland America Line: 50% share owned 1902-1917
 Atlantic Transport Line: 1901-1931
 Baltimore Mail Line: 1930-1937
 Dominion Line: 1902-1926
 Leyland Line: 1902-1927
 Panama Pacific Line: 1915-1938
 Red Star Line: 1871-1934
 Roosevelt Steamship Company: 1931-1940
 United States Lines: 1931-1943 (continued as IMM's successor company)
 White Star Line: 1902-1927

See also
 International Mercantile Marine Company Building, former New York City headquarters

Notes

References

Further reading
 Boyce, Gordon. The Growth and Dissolution of a Large-Scale Business Enterprise (Research in Maritime History 49, 2012), chapter 4: "Trouble on the Transatlantic Route."
 Gittelman, Steven H.: J.P. Morgan and the Transportation Kings — The Titanic and Other Disasters. University Press of America, Inc., 2012

External links 
 Number One Broadway—The Home Port of the International Mercantile Marine Company (Brief history of location with latest building, rebuilt for IMMC with list of shipping line holdings.) 
 «Die 'Titanic stocks', Rose und die zweite Maid» a scripophilistic article listing/showing all known IMM stocks and bonds, and incl. other related documents (in German)
 Baltimore Mail Line History and Ephemera GG Archives

Defunct shipping companies of the United States
Transport companies established in 1902
1902 establishments in New Jersey